Lizhuang could refer to the following towns in China:
Lizhuang, Dangshan County, in Dangshan County, Anhui
Lizhuang, Ganyu County, in Ganyu County, Jiangsu
Lizhuang, Huimin County, in Huimin County, Shandong
, in Mianning County, Sichuan
Lizhuang, Tancheng County, in Tancheng County, Shandong
Lizhuang, Yibin, in Cuiping District, Yibin, Sichuan